Peter Öberg (born 17 April 1980) is a Swedish orienteering competitor and European champion.

He received a gold medal in relay at the European Orienteering Championships in 2006 in Otepää, together with Niclas Jonasson and David Andersson.

He received a silver medal in relay at the 2007 World Orienteering Championships in Kyiv, together with David Andersson and Emil Wingstedt.

Peter runs for the club OK Hällen in Stigtomta.

References

External links

Swedish orienteers
Living people
1980 births
Foot orienteers
Male orienteers
World Orienteering Championships medalists
Competitors at the 2009 World Games
Junior World Orienteering Championships medalists